Hywel Williams (born 1953) is a Welsh Plaid Cymru politician serving as the Member of Parliament (MP) for Arfon, previously Caernarfon, since 2001. He announced his intention to retire in 2022.

Early life
Williams was born in Pwllheli in 1953, and received his education at Ysgol Troed yr Allt, Pwllheli Grammar School and then Ysgol Glan y Môr.

He studied Psychology at the University College of South Wales and Monmouthshire (now Cardiff University) before qualifying as a social worker at University College of North Wales (now Bangor University) in 1977/78. He was a mental health social worker in the Dwyfor area before joining the Centre for Social Work Practice at the University of Wales, Bangor in 1985.

He was a project worker at the centre, specialising in developing practice through the medium of Welsh, developing a host of short courses available in Welsh for the first time, as well as producing and editing numerous books and training packages with his colleagues, including the first ever social work vocabulary in Welsh. He was appointed Head of the Centre in 1993.

In 1995, Williams left to work as a freelance lecturer, consultant and writer in the fields of social policy, social work, and social care, working primarily through the medium of Welsh. For the next six years, he worked for a variety of universities and colleges in Wales and abroad, as well as working for public bodies, charities, private companies and local and central government, including spending time as an adviser to the House of Commons Welsh Affairs Committee.

He has been a member of numerous professional bodies in relation to social work and training, and was also spokesman for the Child Poverty Action Group in Wales.

Political career

Williams was elected to represent the Caernarfon constituency in the 2001 general election, following Dafydd Wigley's retirement, and again in 2005, with a significantly increased majority. In 2010, he won the new Arfon seat, which, following boundary changes, was at that time considered a Labour seat in Westminster terms. He was re-elected as Plaid Cymru MP for the Arfon constituency in May 2015 with an increased majority. He was a member of the Welsh Affairs Select Committee between 2004 and 2010 and joined the Science and Technology Select Committee and the House Works of Art Committee in 2012.

In 2005 he joined the Panel of Chairs. This role involves chairing backbench debates, standing committees on legislation, committees on secondary legislation and from time to time, meetings of the whole House as a Committee in the main chamber.

His parliamentary responsibilities within Plaid Cymru are work and pensions, defence, international development and culture.

Williams' majority was cut to just 92 votes at the 2017 election, with Labour's Mary Clarke coming close to unseating him, but at the 2019 General Election increased his majority to 2,781  In March 2019, he voted for an amendment tabled by members of The Independent Group calling for a second public vote on EU membership.

In November 2022, Williams announced that he would step down as an MP at the next general election.

References

External links

1953 births
Living people
People from Gwynedd
Alumni of Cardiff University
Plaid Cymru MPs
UK MPs 2001–2005
UK MPs 2005–2010
UK MPs 2010–2015
UK MPs 2015–2017
UK MPs 2017–2019
People educated at Ysgol Glan y Môr
Welsh-speaking politicians
Members of Parliament for Caernarfon
UK MPs 2019–present